Najafabad (also Romanized as Najafābād) is a village in Takht-e Jolgeh Rural District, in the Central District of Firuzeh County, Razavi Khorasan Province, Iran. At the 2006 census, its population was 539, in 126 families.

References 

Populated places in Firuzeh County